Miss Universe Morocco or Miss Maroc Beauty Pageant is a national beauty pageant that selects the representative of Morocco for the Miss Universe competition.

History
Miss Morocco Contest is the oldest continuing beauty contest in Morocco. The contest was first broadcast on television in 1959, with the number of viewers peaking in the nineties when it became watched by nearly half a billion people around the world. The competition qualifies for the Miss Universe election but the country has yet to return to the Miss Universe pageant. Night Star Maroc is currently the owner of the "Miss Maroc" trademark. 

The first known Miss Maroc representing the newly independent nation of Morocco in 1956 was Lydia Marin who competed in Miss World that same year. In 1953, nine women were selected to represent Morocco at Miss Universe, an annual international beauty pageant that is run by the American-based Miss Universe Organization. Between 1950s and 1970s, Morocco sent delegates to major international pageants such as Miss Universe, Miss World, and Miss International pageants.

Jacqueline Dorella Bonilla, named Miss Morocco in 1957, was one of the most famous Moroccan competitors to ever make it to the American beauty contest, ending up as one of the top 15 semifinalists in the competition. 

Raymonde Valle was one of the first Moroccan beauties to represent the country in the Tokyo-based contest. It was in 1960 that Raymonde was selected to compete for the title.

In 2021 the new formation of Miss Universe Morocco created in Casablanca. The winner expected to be at Miss Universe 2021.

Titleholders

Titleholders under Miss Maroc org.

Miss Universe Morocco

Miss Maroc sent the main winner to Miss Universe since 1953. On occasion, when the winner does not qualify (due to age) for either contest, a runner-up is sent.

References

Morocco
Morocco
Morocco
Recurring events established in 1956
Moroccan awards
Beauty pageants in Morocco